Ameen Salifu (born July 25, 1965) is a Ghanaian politician and member of the Sixth Parliament of the Fourth Republic of Ghana representing the  Wa East Constituency in the Upper West Region of Ghana on the ticket of the National Democratic Congress.

Personal life 
Salifu is a Muslim (Ahmadi). He is married with three children.

Early life and education 
Salifu was born on July 25, 1965. He hails from Goripe, a town in the Western Region of Ghana. He entered University of East London and obtained his master's degree in NGO and Development Management in 2007. He also attended the London School of Economics and obtained his master's degree in science in International Housing and Social Change in 2000.

Politics 
Salifu is a member of the National Democratic Congress (NDC). In 2012, he contested for the  Wa East seat on the ticket of the NDC sixth parliament of the fourth republic and won.

Employment 
 Capital Works Surveyor, Presentation Housing Association, London
 District Chief Executive (Wa District), April 2009 – January 7, 2013

References

Ghanaian MPs 2009–2013
Ghanaian Muslims
Ghanaian Ahmadis
Living people
Alumni of the London School of Economics
1965 births
Ghanaian MPs 2013–2017
National Democratic Congress (Ghana) politicians